Mark Bunn (born 24 October 1970) is a former Australian rules footballer.

Career
Bunn played in the AFL from 1990 to 1995, including with the Fitzroy Football Club between 1990 and 1992, and later the Hawthorn Football Club from 1993 to 1995. He played a total of 53 games.

Post football
Following his football career, Bunn has become a professional speaker in the areas of health, wellbeing and business performance,
specializing in combining Ayurvedic medicine with Western-health science.

In 2010, he wrote the book 'Ancient Wisdom for Modern Health'.

Publication and works
● Ancient Wisdom for Modern Health - The Essential Wisdoms of Health & Happiness. Enlightened Health Publishing. 2010. 9780980759709

References

External links 
 

Fitzroy Football Club players
Hawthorn Football Club players
Australian rules footballers from Victoria (Australia)
Australian motivational speakers
1970 births
Living people